Cynthiana-Harrison County Airport  is a public use airport located two nautical miles (3.7 km) south of the central business district of Cynthiana, in Harrison County, Kentucky, United States. It is owned by the Cynthiana-Harrison County Airport Board.

Facilities and aircraft
It has one asphalt paved runway designated 11/29 which measures 3,852 by 75 feet (1,174 x 23 m).

For the 12-month period ending November 28, 2008, the airport had 8,530 aircraft operations, an average of 23 per day: 94% general aviation, 4% air taxi and 2% military. At that time there were 30 aircraft based at this airport: 77% single-engine, 10% multi-engine and 13% ultralight.

References

External links
 Cynthiana-Harrison County Airport
 Aerial photo as of 12 March 1997 from USGS The National Map
 

Airports in Kentucky
Buildings and structures in Harrison County, Kentucky
Transportation in Harrison County, Kentucky